The February 2018 Benghazi bombing was an attack with bombs on the Saad Ben Obadah mosque in Benghazi, Libya.

Attack 
The bomb attack occurred on Friday, 9 February 2018 in the Saad Ben Obadah mosque in Benghazi. The explosives, hidden in bags, were detonated remotely during Friday prayers. As a result, two people died and 143 more were injured, the victims included children. No group took responsibility for the attack.

Reactions 
After the bombing, all mosques in Benghazi were instructed to install security cameras.

See also 
Libyan Civil War (2014–present)
List of terrorist incidents in 2018
January 2018 Benghazi bombing

References 

2018 in Libya
History of Benghazi
Mass murder in 2018
Terrorist incidents in Libya in 2018
February 2018 crimes in Africa
2018 murders in Libya